The 2021–22 Arizona State Sun Devils men's ice hockey season was the 7th season of play for the program at the Division I level. The Sun Devils represented Arizona State University and were coached by Greg Powers, in his 10th season.

Season
Arizona State spent their entire season hovering around the .500 mark. The team alternated short winning and losing streaks and were only one more than 3 away from an even record. Despite this consistent mediocrity, ASU had put themselves, partly due to the difficulty of their schedule, into a potential NCAA tournament appearance by mid-January.

The Sun Devils' offense led the way with three players averaging more than a point per game. Freshman Josh Doan, son of famed Arizona Coyotes captain Shane Doan, teamed with sophomore Matthew Kopperud and graduate transfer Colin Theisen to form one of the top offensive lines in the country. Unfortunately, the team's defense wasn't nearly as strong; Arizona State was one of the worst teams in the nation in terms of goals allowed and it was all the offense could do on some nights to keep them in games.

When the Sun Devils met Minnesota State in late-January, Arizona State had a narrow path to a tournament bid if they could earn a split with the #1 team. ASU scored 5 goals in the two games, which was more than most could claim, but they couldn't stop the Mavericks' offense and lost both contests. Their very slim chances were ended the following week when Alaska came to town and swept the weekend slate. Arizona State managed to get their record back up to even by the end of the season but it was apparent that, moving forward, their defensive game needed improvement.

Departures

Recruiting

Roster
As of August 30, 2021.

|}

Standings

Schedule and results

|-
!colspan=12 style=";" | Regular Season

Scoring statistics

Goaltending statistics

Rankings

Note: USCHO did not release a poll in week 24.

References

2021–22
Arizona State Sun Devils
Arizona State Sun Devils
2021 in sports in Arizona
2022 in sports in Arizona